Germany participated in the Eurovision Song Contest 2005 with the song "Run & Hide" written by David Brandes, Jane Tempest and John O'Flynn. The song was performed by Gracia. The German entry for the 2005 contest in Kyiv, Ukraine was selected through the national final Germany 12 Points!, organised by the German broadcaster ARD in collaboration with Norddeutscher Rundfunk (NDR). The national final took place on 12 March 2005 and featured ten competing acts with the winner being selected through two rounds of public voting. "Run & Hide" performed by Gracia was selected as the German entry for Kyiv after placing second in the top two during the first round of voting and ultimately gaining 52.8% of the vote in the second round.

As a member of the "Big Four", Germany automatically qualified to compete in the final of the Eurovision Song Contest. Performing in position 17, Germany placed twenty-fourth (last) out of the 24 participating countries with 4 points.

Background 

Germany has won the contest on one occasion: in 1982 with the song "Ein bißchen Frieden" performed by Nicole. Germany, to this point, has been noted for having competed in the contest more than any other country; they have competed in every contest since the first edition in 1956 except for the 1996 contest when the nation was eliminated in a pre-contest elimination round. In 2004, the German entry "Can't Wait Until Tonight" performed by Max placed eighth out of twenty-four competing songs scoring 93 points.

The German national broadcaster, ARD, broadcasts the event within Germany and delegates the selection of the nation's entry to the regional broadcaster Norddeutscher Rundfunk (NDR). NDR confirmed that Germany would participate in the 2005 Eurovision Song Contest on 21 September 2004. Since 1996, NDR had set up national finals with several artists to choose both the song and performer to compete at Eurovision for Germany. The broadcaster also announced that they would organise a multi-artist national final to select the German entry.

Before Eurovision

Germany 12 Points! 
Germany 12 Points! was the competition that selected Germany's entry for the Eurovision Song Contest 2005. The competition took place on 12 March 2005 at the Treptow Arena in Berlin, hosted by Reinhold Beckmann. Ten acts competed during the show with the winner being selected through a public televote. The show was broadcast on Das Erste as well as online via the broadcaster's Eurovision Song Contest website eurovision.de. The national final was watched by 3.56 million viewers in Germany.

Competing entries 
Nine of the ten artists were nominated by record companies. The nine participating acts were announced on 27 January 2005 and Gracia was announced as the tenth act on 9 February 2005 following her success in the German Top 40 singles charts during early 2005.

Final 
The televised final took place on 12 March 2005. The winner was selected through two rounds of public voting, including options for landline, SMS and app voting. In the first round of voting, the top three entries were selected to proceed to the second round. In the second round, the winner, "Run & Hide" performed by Gracia, was selected. In addition to the performances of the competing entries, winner of the Eurovision Song Contest 2004 Ruslana as well as singers Al Di Meola, Emma Bunton, Leonid Agutin and Patricia Kaas performed in the final.

Controversy 
Following Gracia's victory at the German national final, it was revealed that her producer David Brandes had been commanded by his record company to manipulate the German singles charts by buying numerous copies of songs, which included "Run & Hide", himself so they would chart in a higher place. The song, which ultimately charted in the top 40 and led to Gracia's selection in the national final as a wildcard, received a three-week ban from the chart listing. National final runner-up Marco Matias later accused NDR of vote rigging, while several former German Eurovision entrants petitioned against Gracia's participation in the contest due to charts manipulation. Despite the backlash, head of German delegation for Eurovision Jürgen Meier-Beer reiterated that Gracia and "Run & Hide" would remain as the German entry for the 2005 Eurovision Song Contest.

At Eurovision
According to Eurovision rules, all nations with the exceptions of the host country and the "Big Four" (France, Germany, Spain and the United Kingdom) are required to qualify from the semi-final in order to compete for the final; the top ten countries from the semi-final progress to the final. As a member of the "Big 4", Germany automatically qualified to compete in the final on 21 May 2005. In addition to their participation in the final, Germany is also required to broadcast and vote in the semi-final. The running order for the final in addition to the semi-final was decided through an allocation draw, and Germany was subsequently drawn to perform in position seventeen, following Ukraine and preceding Croatia. At the conclusion of the final, Germany placed twenty-fourth (last) in the final, scoring 4 points.

In Germany, the two shows were broadcast on Das Erste which featured commentary by Peter Urban, as well as on Deutschlandfunk and NDR 2 which featured commentary by Thomas Mohr. The German spokesperson, who announced the top 12-point score awarded by the German televote during the final, was Thomas Hermanns.

Voting
Below is a breakdown of points awarded to Germany and awarded by Germany in the semi-final and grand final of the contest, and the breakdown of the voting conducted during the two shows. Germany awarded its 12 points to Portugal in the semi-final and to Greece in the grand final of the contest.

Points awarded to Germany

Points awarded by Germany

References

2005
Countries in the Eurovision Song Contest 2005
Eurovision
Eurovision